Bay Pines National Cemetery is a United States National Cemetery located in Pinellas County, northwest of the city of St. Petersburg, Florida. It encompasses , and as of the end of 2008, had 27,369 interments.

Geography
Bay Pines address is 10,000 Bay Pines Blvd., North, Bay Pines, Florida in Pinellas County, adjacent to Bay Pines Veterans Administration Medical Center.

History 
The site is believed to have been used as a burial ground as early as the Indian Wars, but did not become an official cemetery until March 15, 1933, when it was used to inter those who died in the nearby veterans' hospitals. The first modern interment was made on April 25, 1933. By 1964, all available plots had been filled. In 1984 it was relandscaped and reorganized to allow for more space. In the same year, on May 28, administration of the cemetery was transferred to the Department of Veterans Affairs and it became a National Cemetery. It is now closed to casketed remains unless there is room at the existing gravesite of other family members.

Notable monuments 
There are several monuments at the cemetery entrance. The oldest is large in size and made of pink Etowah marble. It was erected in 1937 and dedicated to "the memory of those who served their country". Another is a polished granite bench, dedicated to the memory of World War I veterans. To commemorate the United States Bicentennial, a maple tree was planted in 1976.
A POW/MIA monument is the newest addition, facing the World War I bench.

Notable burials
  George Bamberger (1923–2004) Professional baseball player and manager
  Billy DeMars (1925–2020) Professional baseball and coach
 Bill Young (1930–2013) US Congressman

See also
 :Category:Burials at Bay Pines National Cemetery

References

External links

 National Cemetery Administration
 Bay Pines National Cemetery
 Bay Pines National Cemetery, records of burial
 
 

Cemeteries in Florida
Protected areas of Pinellas County, Florida
United States national cemeteries
1933 establishments in Florida